Shwartzman phenomenon is a rare reaction of a body to particular types of toxins, called endotoxins, which cause thrombosis in the affected tissue.  A clearing of the thrombosis results in a reticuloendothelial blockade, which prevents re-clearing of the thrombosis caused by a repeat introduction of the toxin.  That will cause tissue necrosis.  Shwartzman phenomenon is usually observed during delivery or abortion, when foreign bodies are introduced into the tissues of the female reproductive system.

The Shwartzman phenomenon is named for Gregory Shwartzman, the doctor at Mount Sinai Hospital in New York City who was the first to develop the concept of immune system hypersensitivity in the 1920s. This reaction was experimented using Neisseria meningitidis endotoxin. A related observation was made by Giuseppe Sanarelli leading to the term Sanarelli-Shwartzman phenomenon, however many modern works use more generic terms such as Disseminated intravascular coagulation.

This is notably seen with Neisseria meningitidis.

References

External links 

Toxicology